"Suburbia" is a song by English synthpop duo Pet Shop Boys. It was remixed and released as the fourth single from the duo's debut studio album, Please (1986), and became the band's second UK top-10 entry, peaking at number 8. "Suburbia" has drawn comparisons to the theme from ALF, which coincidentally premiered the day that the song was released.

Background and music video
The song's primary inspiration is the 1983 Penelope Spheeris film Suburbia, and its depiction of violence and squalor in the suburbs of Los Angeles; in addition, the tension of the Brixton riots of 1981 and of 1985 hanging in recent memory led Neil Tennant of the duo to thinking about the boredom of suburbia and the underlying tension among disaffected youth that sparked off the riots at the least provocation.

The various versions of the song are punctuated by sounds of suburban violence, riots and smashing glass, as well as snarling dogs on the re-recorded single version (extended even further on the music video), which were derived from typical scenes in suburbia. The version used for the video was the song that appeared on the PopArt compilation in 2003.

The video was directed by Eric Watson, and features footage of the duo in a Los Angeles suburb, as they happened to be there for that year's MTV Video Music Awards and a contrasting image of British suburbia, filmed in Kingston-upon-Thames, a suburb of south-west London.

The B-sides to the single were "Jack the Lad" and "Paninaro". "The Full Horror" mix of Suburbia and the Italian Mix of Paninaro, which appeared on the Suburbia 12-inch, both also appeared on the Pet Shop Boys' album Disco, and were later collected on the 2001 2-disc re-release of "Please".

Track listings
7-inch: Parlophone / R 6140 (UK)
 "Suburbia" – 4:06
 "Paninaro" – 4:37

2×7-inch: Parlophone / RD 6140 (UK)
 "Suburbia" – 4:05
 "Paninaro" – 4:37
 "Love Comes Quickly" [Shep Pettibone Mastermix] (Early Fade) – 6:12
 "Jack the Lad" – 4:30
 "Suburbia Pt. Two" – 2:20

MC: Parlophone / TC R 6140 (UK)
 "Suburbia" – 4:06
 "Paninaro" – 4:37
 "Jack the Lad" – 4:30
 "Love Comes Quickly" [Shep Pettibone Mastermix] – 7:34

MC: Parlophone / TR 6140 (UK)
 "Suburbia" (The Full Horror) – 8:55
 "Paninaro" – 4:37
 "Jack the Lad" – 4:30
 "Love Comes Quickly" [Shep Pettibone Mastermix] (Even Earlier Fade) – 5:31

12-inch: Parlophone / 12 R 6140 (UK)
 "Suburbia" (The Full Horror) – 8:55
 "Paninaro" – 4:37
 "Jack the Lad" – 4:30

12-inch: EMI America / V-19226 (US)
 "Suburbia" (The Full Horror) – 8:55
 "Suburbia" (7-inch version) – 4:06
 "Jack the Lad" – 4:30

 "Suburbia" (New version, The Full Horror and Part Two remixed by Julian Mendelsohn)

Charts

Weekly charts

Year-end charts

In Australia, "Suburbia" missed the Kent Music Report Top 100 Singles chart, but was listed as one of the singles receiving significant sales reports beyond the top 100 for one week in November 1986, being ranked tenth on this list.

References

Further reading
 Heath, Chris (2001). Suburbia. In Please / Further Listening 1984–1986 [CD liner notes]. London: Pet Shop Boys Partnership.
 

1986 singles
1986 songs
Parlophone singles
Pet Shop Boys songs
Song recordings produced by Julian Mendelsohn
Songs written by Chris Lowe
Songs written by Neil Tennant
Ultratop 50 Singles (Flanders) number-one singles